MyNet may refer to:

 MyNetworkTV, USA
 Mynet, an Israeli news service and subsidiary of Ynet, providing local news
 the internet service of Telepassport Telecommunications, Cyprus